Hydramethylnon is an organofluorine compound.  It is also known as AC 217,300.  It is in a chemical class called trifluoromethyl aminohydrazone, which is a metabolic inhibitor. It is classified as a pesticide designed to control insects that are harmful to humans. It works by inhibiting complex III in the mitochondrial inner membrane and leads to a halting of oxidative phosphorylation.  It is used primarily as an insecticide in the form of baits for cockroaches and ants.  Some brands of insecticides that include hydramethylnon are Amdro, Blatex, Combat, Cyaforce, Cyclon, Faslane, Grant's, Impact, Matox, Maxforce, Pyramdron, Siege, Scuttle and Wipeout.  Hydramethylnon is a slow-acting poison with delayed toxicity that needs to be eaten to be effective.

Toxicology
Hydramethylnon has low toxicity in mammals.  The oral  is 1100–1300 mg/kg in rats and above 28,000 mg/kg in dogs.  Hydramethylnon is toxic to fish; the 96-hour LC50 in rainbow trout is 0.16 mg/L, 0.10 mg/L in channel catfish, and 1.70 mg/L in bluegill sunfish.

Hydramethylnon, when fed to rats for two years, led to an increase in uterine and adrenal tumors at the highest dose; therefore, the Environmental Protection Agency classifies hydramethylnon as a possible human carcinogen.

See also
 Fipronil, another insecticide used for similar purposes

References

External links
 
Hydramethylnon Technical Fact Sheet - National Pesticide Information Center
Hydramethylnon General Fact Sheet - National Pesticide Information Center
Hydramethylnon Pesticide Information Profile - Extension Toxicology Network
Maxforce MSDS.
Amdro MSDS

Alkene derivatives
Benzene derivatives
Hydrazones
Insecticides
Trifluoromethyl compounds